Boccaccio is a 1940 Italian operetta film directed by Marcello Albani and starring Clara Calamai, Osvaldo Valenti and Silvana Jachino. It is based on the 1879 operetta Boccaccio by Franz von Suppé. It was made at the Scalera Studios in Rome.

Cast
 Clara Calamai as Giannina, falso Boccaccio  
 Osvaldo Valenti as Berto  
 Silvana Jachino as Fiammetta  
 Luigi Almirante as Maestro Scalza  
 Osvaldo Genazzani as Il principe di Parnormo  
 Virgilio Riento as Il bottaro  
 Anita Farra as Beatrice  
 Bice Parisi as Peronella  
 Nera Novella as Isabella  
 Raffaele di Napoli as Il duca di Calabria  
 Rudi Dal Pra as Leonetto  
 Amilcare Pettinelli as Il Siniscalco 
 Daniella Drei as Una ancella  
 Gino Bianchi as Lambertuccio  
 Dino De Laurentiis as Uno degli studenti con la penna

References

Bibliography 
 Goble, Alan. The Complete Index to Literary Sources in Film. Walter de Gruyter, 1999.

External links 
 

1940 films
Italian historical musical films
1940s historical musical films
1940s Italian-language films
Films based on works by Giovanni Boccaccio
Films directed by Marcello Albani
Operetta films
Films based on operettas
Films set in Florence
Films set in the 14th century
Italian black-and-white films
The Decameron
Films shot at Scalera Studios
1940s Italian films